Ram Parikshan Roy (1920–1997) was an Indian Professor of Botany. He made significant contributions to the fields of genomics analysis, cytogenetics, plant breeding, tissue culture and cytotaxonomy.

Early life and education
Roy was born in Gangapur, Bihar, India in 1920. He started his career as a lecturer at Patna Science College in 1947. He obtained his degree of PhD from University of Cambridge in 1953.

Career 
Roy became a Professor and Head of Botany at Patna University at a young age of 37. Later he held the positions of Dean of Science and Coordinator, UGC Centre of Special Assistance in Cytogenetics at Patna. He became CSIR (Council of Scientific and Industrial Research) Emeritus Scientist in 1982.

Research and publications
Roy conducted a survey of local fauna in Patna and brought out a monograph entitled Trees of Patna in 1948. He established an active school on Cytogenetics of plants in the fifties at Patna University. Further he started an important and ambitious program on Cytogenetics of Indian cucurbits in early 1960s.

Awards and recognition
Roy won Birbal Sahni Gold Medal in 1973 and Jawaharlal Nehru Fellowship in 1975. He was elected Fellow of the National Academy of Sciences, India, Indian Botanical Society, Indian Society of Genetics, and Plant Breeding Society (London). He became President of Indian Science Congress in 1972. Roy was the founder President of the Society of Cytologists.

References 

20th-century Indian biologists

1997 deaths
1920 births
Fellows of the Indian National Science Academy
Indian scientists
Alumni of the University of Cambridge
Indian expatriates in the United Kingdom